TYU may refer to:

Taiyuan railway station (Shanxi), Shanxi, China, China Railway Pinyin code
Tin Yuet stop, Hong Kong, MTR station code
Tshwa language (ISO 639: tyu), a Khoe language spoken in Botswana and Zimbabwe